Tambov State University named after G. R. Derzhavin (TSU, Derzhavin Tambov State University) is a state university in Tambov, Russia.

History 
Sometimes referred to as G. R. Derzhavin State University, it is named in honor of the Russian poet and statesman, Gavrila Romanovich Derzhavin, and was formed in 1994 when the Tambov State Pedagogical Institute and Tambov State Institute of Culture were merged into a single institution.

Faculties and departments
 Mathematics, Physics and Information Technology
 Department of Computer and Information Technology (IT)
 Department of Algebra and Geometry
 Department of Computing and Mathematical Modeling (CMM)
 Department of Mathematical Analysis
 Department of Theoretical and Experimental Physics (TEP)
 Department of General Physics
 Economics
 Department of Finance and Banking (FiBD)
 Department of Political Economy and the world global economy (PE and IYC)
 Department of Business Informatics and Mathematics (BIiM)
 Department of Accounting and Taxation
 Management and Service
 Department of Linguistic Support of business processes
 Department of Service and Trading Business
 Department of Management and Marketing
 Department of State and Municipal Management (MCM)
 Department of Personnel Management
 Medical Institute
 Department of Microbiology and Infectious Diseases
 Department of Therapy 
 Department of Public Health and Safety
 Department of Physiology
 Department of Surgery
 Department of Eye and Nerve disease
 Department of Biochemistry and Pharmacology
 Department of Anatomy, Operative surgery and Oncology
 Department of Pathology
 Department of Obstetrics and Gynecology
 Department of Traumatology, Orthopedics 
 Department of Clinical Psychology
 Department of Developmental Psychology
 Department of Defectology
 Law and National Security
 Theory and History of State and Law
 Department of Constitutional and International Law
 Department of Civil Law 
 Department of Civil and Arbitration Proceedings
 Department of Criminal Law and Procedure
 Department of law enforcement and forensic science
 Department of  Human Rights and Democracy
 Department of Life Safety
 Department of Specialized Training and National Security
 Philology
 Department of Linguistics and didactics
 Department of English Philology
 Department of German and French Philology
 Department of Russian and Foreign Literature
 Department of Russian Language
 Department of Russian as a Foreign Language 
 Department of Advertising and Public Relations
 Department of Foreign Languages in Professional Communication
 Department of Journalism and Publishing
 Humanities and Sociocultural Education
 Department of Information Resources
 Department of General History
 Department of Design
 Department of Music and Dance 
 Department of Russian History
 Department of Social and Cultural Communications 
 Department of Theoretical and Applied Sociology
 Department of International Relations and Political Science
 Department of Philosophy
 Education
 Department of General Pedagogy and Psychology
 Department of theory and methodology of preschool and primary education
 Department of Social Work
 Department of Psychological and Pedagogical Education
 Department of Pre-University Training profile
 Environmental Technologies and Sports
 Department of Biology
 Department of Chemistry
 Department of Ecology and Tourism
 Department of Geography and Land Management
 Department of Physical Education
 Department of Theory and Methodology of Sports Disciplines
 Department of Theory and Methodology of Physical Education and Sport
 Department of Adaptive Physical Education

See also
Tambov State Technical University

References

External links
 Official Website in Russian
 Official Website in English

Universities in Russia
1994 establishments in Russia
Tambov